Sonia Rincón Chanona (born 10 November 1952) is a Mexican politician affiliated with the PANAL. She served as federal deputy of both the LIX and LXII Legislatures of the Mexican Congress representing Chiapas, as well as a local deputy in the LXIII Legislature of the Congress of Chiapas.

References

1952 births
Living people
Politicians from Chiapas
Women members of the Chamber of Deputies (Mexico)
New Alliance Party (Mexico) politicians
21st-century Mexican politicians
21st-century Mexican women politicians
People from Tuxtla Gutiérrez
Members of the Congress of Chiapas
Deputies of the LXII Legislature of Mexico
Members of the Chamber of Deputies (Mexico) for Chiapas